Džemal Mustedanagić (born 8 June 1955) is a Bosnian-Herzegovinian retired footballer and current manager of the Albania national under-16 football team.

Playing career

Club
Born in Bosanski Novi, his playing career started in FK Sloboda Bosanski Novi where he played from 1968 till 1973 when he was approached by several Yugoslavian first league clubs. He chose Dinamo Zagreb where he played from 1973 till 1983 and had 444 caps, winning the 1981–82 Yugoslav First League title and the 1979–80 Yugoslav Cup title. Also he was first team captain during Miroslav Blažević's managing. He moved to FK Austria Wien in 1983. During that time they won 3 national titles, a national cup, and a famous club achievement – beating FC Barcelona.

International
He made his debut for Yugoslavia in a September 1980 World Cup qualification match against Denmark, coming on as a second half substitute for Ivan Buljan. It remained his sole international appearance.

Managerial career
After his player career in 1987, on demand of the management board of Dinamo Zagreb, he started working with youngsters as a coach in Dinamo Zagreb Football school. In season 2003/2004 he coached the reserve squad of Dinamo Zagreb, where he trained and developed top youngsters' talents such as Eduardo Da Silva, Luka Modrić, Niko Kranjčar, Vedran Ćorluka, Dino Drpić, Tomo Šokota, Mihael Mikić, Hrvoje Čale, Filip Lončarić. Also, during that period, considering talents he brought up to national team, he was selected to work with the expert committee of the Croatian national team, as coach of the U-19 national team.

This talented youngsters made their way to first team, and in 2005 and 2006 he became coach with Josip Kuže of first team Dinamo Zagreb. They took Dinamo from 7th place to winning first place with these youngsters who are leading players today, not only in Dinamo but in national team, too.

Albania national team
In 2009, he arrived in Albania and the Albanian Football Association appointed him as assistant coach of Josip Kuže at the Albania national football team. 
After Kuže's medical problems, Džemal was appointed as a caretaker coach of the Albania national football team in October 2010. Then following the departure of Kuže after the end of the UEFA Euro 2012 qualifying, Mustedanagić was a temporary coach of Albania for two friendly matches in November 2011 against Azerbaijan on 11 November and Macedonia on 15 November.

In 2011, he took charge of the Albania national under-17 football team and in his debut he qualified the team to the next round of 2012 UEFA European Under-17 Championship, the Elite round.

In November 2017 he was charged to run at the same time the Albania national under-16 team. He participated in the 2017 Mercedez Benz Aegean Cup International Youth Tournament in Turkey, recording a 0–1 loss in the first match against Azerbaijan U16 on 20 November,  a 0–0 draw in the second match against hosts Turkey U16 on 21 November and a 2–1 loss in the last match against Kosovo U16 on 23 November.

References

External links

 Profile at Austria Wien

1955 births
Living people
People from Novi Grad, Bosnia and Herzegovina
Association football defenders
Association football midfielders
Association football utility players
Yugoslav footballers
Yugoslavia international footballers
FK Sloboda Novi Grad players
GNK Dinamo Zagreb players
FK Austria Wien players
Yugoslav First League players
Austrian Football Bundesliga players
Yugoslav expatriate footballers
Expatriate footballers in Austria
Yugoslav expatriate sportspeople in Austria
Bosnia and Herzegovina football managers
Albania national football team managers
Bosnia and Herzegovina expatriate football managers
Bosnia and Herzegovina expatriate sportspeople in Croatia
Bosnia and Herzegovina expatriate sportspeople in Albania